Fathepur (1st) High School is a public secondary school in Naogaon Sadar Upazila, Naogaon District, Bangladesh.  It was established in 1968. It runs from third grade to the tenth grade. The exertion of establishing a secondary school in Fathepur was taken by Abdul Jalil, who was the deputy collector of Naogaon and supervisor of Gaza society of that time. By his efforts some landowners, rich people and farmers gave financial assistance.

References

External links 
[./Https://www.facebook.com/fathepurhsn/ Fathepur (1st) High School]

Schools in Naogaon District
High schools in Bangladesh
Educational institutions established in 1975